Robert Thomas Walker (born November 7, 1948) is a former American professional baseball pitcher. Walker pitched all or part of six seasons in Major League Baseball (MLB), from 1972 until 1977, for the Montreal Expos, Detroit Tigers, St. Louis Cardinals and California Angels.

Career
After graduating from Chamberlain High School in Tampa, Florida in 1966, Walker was drafted by the Baltimore Orioles in the 1968 January amateur draft. On August 4, 1971, while playing for the Dallas-Fort Worth Spurs in the Double-A Dixie Association, Walker threw a 15-inning no-hitter to beat the Albuquerque Dodgers 1–0. He threw 193 pitches to win the game. In 1972, Walker was selected by the Montreal Expos in the Rule 5 draft and made his major league debut that season. He was traded along with Terry Humphrey from the Expos to the Tigers for Woodie Fryman on December 4, . The last batter he faced in the majors, Lyman Bostock, lined into a triple play.  Walker posted an 18–23 record in 191 major league appearances over six seasons.

Brush with death
In 1972, while playing winter ball in Puerto Rico, Walker along with several other players helped Roberto Clemente load a plane carrying relief supplies to survivors of the Nicaragua earthquake after Christmas. He offered to accompany Clemente on the trip to the Central American nation, but the plane was full and Clemente told him to stay behind and enjoy his New Year's Eve. A few hours later, Walker returned to his condo and saw the news reports that Clemente's plane had crashed off the coast of Isla Verde, Puerto Rico.

Personal life
Tom's son, Neil Walker, is a former MLB player who retired in 2021. Another son, Matt, played in the minor leagues as an outfielder in the Detroit Tigers and Baltimore Orioles systems, while another son, Sean, pitched for George Mason University. Tom is also the brother-in-law of former Montreal Expos pitcher, Chip Lang. Meanwhile, Don Kelly, a player for the Detroit Tigers, married his daughter Carrie, a former professional basketball player, in 2007.

In July 2015, Walker was elected to the Texas League Hall of Fame.

See also
List of second-generation Major League Baseball players

References

External links

1948 births
Living people
American expatriate baseball players in Canada
Baseball players from Tampa, Florida
California Angels players
Columbus Clippers players
Dallas–Fort Worth Spurs players
Denver Bears players
Detroit Tigers players
Major League Baseball pitchers
Memphis Blues players
Miami Marlins (FSL) players
Montreal Expos players
Salt Lake City Gulls players
St. Louis Cardinals players
Stockton Ports players
Tulsa Oilers (baseball) players